Mari Toro (born November 11, 1979) is a Puerto Rican former professional tennis player.

Toro began playing tennis at the age of six and was educated in Miami. Undefeated in her only season of high school tennis, she was ranked in the top-five for the 18s category in Florida.

As a collegiate player she had one season at Florida International University, before transferring as a sophomore to the University of Miami, where her elder sister Tari Ann was one of the coaches.

Between 1997 and 2002, Toro appeared in 26 ties for the Puerto Rico Fed Cup team, winning 15 singles rubbers. Her 11 wins in doubles play remains a team record. She was a women's doubles gold medalist at the 2002 Central American and Caribbean Games in San Salvador, partnering Vilmarie Castellvi.

References

External links
 
 
 

1979 births
Living people
Puerto Rican female tennis players
FIU Panthers women's tennis players
Miami Hurricanes women's tennis players
Competitors at the 2002 Central American and Caribbean Games
Competitors at the 1998 Central American and Caribbean Games
Central American and Caribbean Games gold medalists for Puerto Rico
Central American and Caribbean Games bronze medalists for Puerto Rico
Central American and Caribbean Games medalists in tennis